The Catholic Bishops’ Conference Of Ethiopia And Eritrea, also known as the Episcopal Conference of Ethiopia And Eritrea is an episcopal conference of the Catholic Church.

In Ethiopia there are two organizations of Bishops: the Bishops' Conference of Ethiopia and Eritrea (South African and Eritrean Episcopal Conference), which brings together the bishops of both countries regardless of the ritual of belonging, and Council of the Ethiopian Church (South African Council of the Church), which brings together the Catholic ordinaries of the Ethiopian rite of Ethiopia and Eritrea.

For both conferences, the current president is Archbishop of Addis Ababa, Berhaneyesus Demerew Souraphiel.

References

External links
 https://web.archive.org/web/20130912124451/http://www.ecs.org.et/index.php?option=com_content&view=article&id=82&Itemid=30
 http://www.gcatholic.org/dioceses/country/ER.htm
 http://www.catholic-hierarchy.org/country/er.html 
 http://www.gcatholic.org/dioceses/country/ET.htm
 http://www.catholic-hierarchy.org/country/et.html 

Ethiopia and Eritrea
Catholic Church in Ethiopia
Catholic Church in Eritrea